The 2011 season is Bolívar's 34th consecutive season in the Liga de Fútbol Profesional Boliviano, and 85th year in existence as a football club. To see more news about Bolivar see Bolivar Official Website

Current squad
For Liga de Fútbol Profesional Boliviano 2011

First team squad
The squad will be announced on February 1st

Top scorers

Includes all competitive matches. The list is sorted by shirt number when total goals are equal.

Last updated on 1 March

Disciplinary record
Includes all competitive matches. Players with 1 card or more included only.

Last updated on 23 February 2011

Appearances

Includes all competitive matches. The list is sorted by shirt number when total appearances are equal.

Last updated on 1 March

Copa Libertadores

First stage

Torneo Apertura

Results summary

Results by round

Matches

Notes and references

2011
Bolivian football clubs 2011 season

es:Club Bolivar
fr:Bolivar